I49 may refer to:

Interstate 49